Panchthar district is one of 14 districts of Koshi Province of eastern hilly region of Nepal. It is a Hill district of eastern Nepal. The 2011 census counted 191,817 population. Phidim is the district headquarters.

History
Panchthar was a part of Old Dhankuta District during Rana era and until 1962. Dhankuta district had two subdivisions Chhathum and Tehrathum. Panchthar was a thum (county) under the Terhathum subvision. It became a separate district in 1962 when the old 32 traditional districts divided into 75 district.

Geography and climate

Demographics
At the time of the 2011 Nepal census, Panchthar District had a population of 191,817. Of these, 40.3% spoke Limbu, 33.9% Nepali, 6.5% Tamang, 5.5% Bantawa, 5.3% Rai, 2.9% Magar, 1.1% Gurung, 0.7% Chamling, 0.7% Sunuwar, 0.5% Newar, 0.3% Maithili, 0.3% Sampang, 0.3% Sherpa, 0.3% Yakkha, 0.2% Khaling, 0.2% Thulung, 0.1% Bhojpuri, 0.1% Nachhiring and 0.2% other languages as their first language.

In terms of ethnicity/caste, 42.1% were Limbu, 13.8% Rai, 10.8% Hill Brahmin, 9.7% Chhetri, 7.1% Tamang, 3.4% Kami, 3.3% Magar, 2.2% Damai/Dholi, 1.9% Gurung, 1.4% Newar, 1.0% Sunuwar, 0.5% Sanyasi/Dasnami, 0.5% Sarki, 0.4% Sherpa, 0.3% Majhi, 0.3% Yakkha, 0.2% Gharti/Bhujel, 0.1% other Dalit, 0.1% Samgpang, 0.1% Teli and 0.4% others.

In terms of religion, 52.0% were Kirati, 34.3% Hindu, 11.7% Buddhist, 1.6% Christian, 0.1% Prakriti and 0.2% others.

In terms of literacy, 72.4% could read and write, 3.2% could only read and 24.4% could neither read nor write.

Municipality and Rural Municipalities of Panchthar
 Phidim Municipality  (Phidim Municipality, Ranitar, Lumphabung, Yangnam(1-5), Nangin, Lungrupa)
 Hilihang Rural Municipality  (Ambarpur, Panchami, Subhang, Bharapa)
  Kummayak Rural Municipality  (Yasok, Rani Gaun, Mangjabung, Syabarumba
 Miklajung Rural Municipality  (Aarubote, Sarangdanda, Rabi, Kurumba, Limba, Durdimba)
 Phalelung Rural Municipality ( (Ektin, Memeng, Prangbung, Yangnam(6,9) Sidin)
 Phalgunanda Rural Municipality ( (Nawamidanda, Imbung, Pauwa Sartap, Chilingdin, Aangsarang, Phaktep)
 Tumbewa Rural Municipality  (Aangna, Olane, Hangum, Mauwa)
 Yangawarak Rural Municipality  (Chyangthapu, Phalaicha, Oyam, Tharpu, Nagi)
VDC's in small brackets means they are combined to form main Rural Municipality

Previous Village Development Committees (VDCs) and Municipalities

Aangna
Aangsarang
Ambarpur
Bharapa
Chilingdin
Chyangthapu
Durdimba
Ektin
Embung
Phalaicha
Hangum
Kurumba
Limba
Lungrupa
Mangjabung
Mauwa
Memeng
Nagi
Nangin
Nawamidanda
Olane
Oyam
Panchami
Prangbung
Pauwa Sartap
Phaktep
Phidim Municipality
Prangbung
Rabi
Rani Gaun
Ranitar
Sarangdanda
Sidin
Subhang
Syabarumba 
Tharpu
Yangnam
Yasok

 lumphabung
 sarangdada
 phaktep

People from Panchthar District
 Bairagi Kainla
 Bhishmaraj Angdembe
 Damber Singh Sambahamphe
 Ganesh Prasad Rijal
 Rambahadur Limbu
 Upendra Subba
 Ratna Bahadur Limbu

See also
Zones of Nepal

References

 

 
Districts of Nepal established in 1962
Districts of Koshi Province